Eric "E. J." Liddell Jr. (born December 18, 2000) is an American professional basketball player for the New Orleans Pelicans of the National Basketball Association (NBA), on a two-way contract with the Birmingham Squadron of the NBA G League. He played college basketball for the Ohio State Buckeyes.

Early life and high school career
Liddell was raised in Belleville, Illinois, and went to high school at Belleville High School-West. He averaged 20.8 points and 8.2 rebounds per game as a junior, won the 2018 Illinois Mr. Basketball award, shared the 2018 St. Louis Post Dispatch Player of the Year with Courtney Ramey, and won the Illinois 4A class state championship. As a senior, he averaged 20.2 points, 9.3 rebounds and 3.8 blocks per game. For the second year in a row, he won Illinois Mr. Basketball, the St. Louis Post Dispatch Player of the Year, and the Illinois 4A class state championship.

Recruiting
Liddell was a consensus four-star recruit and ranked the best player in the state of Illinois. On October 1, 2018, Liddell committed to playing college basketball for Ohio State over scholarship offers from teams such as Illinois, Missouri, and Wisconsin.

College career

Liddell came off the bench during his freshman year, averaging 6.7 points and 3.8 rebounds per game. He played in all 31 games and was second on the team with 29 blocks. He had a double-double in a win against Illinois.

During the early parts of his sophomore season, he contracted mononucleosis, which led to Liddell being out for several games. He had another good game against Illinois during his sophomore year, scoring a season-high 26 points in a win. 
Liddell averaged 16.2 points, 6.7 rebounds, and 1.1 blocks per game during his sophomore season. After Ohio State's Round of 64 loss to Oral Roberts, Liddell received threats from basketball fans via social media. After he posted screenshots of the threats on Twitter, Ohio State reached out to law enforcement regarding the threats.

On March 31, 2021, Liddell declared for the 2021 NBA draft while maintaining his college eligibility. He later withdrew from the draft and announced that would return to Ohio State for his junior season. On January 9, 2022, Liddell scored a career-high 34 points in a 95–87 win against Northwestern. He was named to the First Team All-Big Ten. As a junior, he averaged 19.4 points, 7.9 rebounds, 2.5 assists and 2.6 blocks per game. On March 25, 2022, Liddell declared for the 2022 NBA draft, forgoing his remaining college eligibility.

Professional career

New Orleans Pelicans (2022–present)
Liddell was drafted in the second round of the 2022 NBA Draft by the New Orleans Pelicans. During an NBA Summer League game against the Atlanta Hawks on July 11, 2022, Liddell suffered a torn ACL. On October 16, he signed a two-way contract with the Pelicans.

Career statistics

College

|-
| style="text-align:left;"| 2019–20
| style="text-align:left;"| Ohio State
| 31 || 0 || 16.6 || .464 || .192 || .718 || 3.8 || .5 || .4 || .9 || 6.7
|-
| style="text-align:left;"| 2020–21
| style="text-align:left;"| Ohio State
| 29 || 29 || 29.4 || .474 || .338 || .746 || 6.7 || 1.8 || .7 || 1.1 || 16.2
|-
| style="text-align:left;"| 2021–22
| style="text-align:left;"| Ohio State
| 32 || 32 || 33.2 || .490 || .374 || .765 || 7.9 || 2.5 || .6 || 2.6 || 19.4
|- class="sortbottom"
| style="text-align:center;" colspan="2"| Career
| 92 || 61 || 26.4 || .480 || .341 || .749 || 6.1 || 1.6 || .5 || 1.6 || 14.1

References

External links

Ohio State Buckeyes bio

2000 births
Living people
21st-century African-American sportspeople
African-American basketball players
All-American college men's basketball players
American men's basketball players
Basketball players from Illinois
New Orleans Pelicans draft picks
Ohio State Buckeyes men's basketball players
Power forwards (basketball)
Sportspeople from Belleville, Illinois